Thomas McMillan (born 26 June 1944) is a Scottish former professional football defender who played for Aberdeen and Falkirk.

McMillan was born in Paisley and played as a youngster at Johnstone Burgh and Neilston Juniors. He signed for Aberdeen in 1965. While playing for Aberdeen, he won a Scottish Cup winners' medal in 1970. He moved to Falkirk in 1972, before eventually taking on a player-manager role with Inverness Thistle.

Honours

 Aberdeen
 Scottish Cup: 1970

Personal life

McMillan later became a Taxicab driver in Aberdeen.

References

1944 births
Living people
Footballers from Paisley, Renfrewshire
Association football central defenders
Aberdeen F.C. players
Scottish Football League players
Scotland under-23 international footballers
Johnstone Burgh F.C. players
Falkirk F.C. players
Inverness Thistle F.C. players
Scottish footballers
Scottish football managers
United Soccer Association players